Harpalus huachuca is a species of ground beetle in the subfamily Harpalinae. It was described by Ball in 1972.

References

huachuca
Beetles described in 1972